Aethes affinis is a moth of the family Tortricidae. It is known only from Costa Rica.

References

External links

 Cochylini (Lepidoptera, Tortricidae) From Costa Rica

Moths described in 1967
affinis
Moths of Central America
Taxa named by Józef Razowski